Zoot! (also released as Zoot Sims Quintet) is an album by American jazz saxophonist Zoot Sims featuring tracks recorded in 1956 for the Riverside label.

Reception

Allmusic awarded the album 3 stars with Scott Yanow calling it "a typically hard-swinging and melodic Zoot Sims date".

Track listing
All compositions by George Handy except as indicated
 "Why Cry?" - 5:54  
 "Echoes of You" - 7:12  
 "Swim, Jim" - 7:07  
 "Here and Now" - 4:55  
 "Fools Rush In (Where Angels Fear to Tread)" (Rube Bloom, Johnny Mercer) - 4:30  
 "Osmosis" (Osie Johnson) - 4:44  
 "Taking a Chance on Love" (Vernon Duke, Ted Fetter, John La Touche) - 6:01

Personnel 
Zoot Sims - alto saxophone, tenor saxophone
Nick Travis - trumpet
George Handy - piano, arranger
Wilbur Ware - bass
Osie Johnson - drums

References 

1957 albums
Zoot Sims albums
Albums produced by Orrin Keepnews
Riverside Records albums